Rhydderch was a 10th-century bishop of Meneva (modern St. David's).

Most sources place his ministry between Ruelin and Elwyn, but the Annals of Wales place him after Morfyw with his date of death  under Phillimore's dating of the A text.

References

Bishops of St Davids
10th-century Welsh bishops